The women's 10,000 metres at the 2022 European Athletics Championships took place at the Olympic Stadium on 15 August.

Records

Schedule

Results

Final

References

10,000 W
10,000 metres at the European Athletics Championships
Euro